Csaba Lantos may refer to:

 Csaba Lantos (politician)
 Csaba Lantos (volleyball player)

Human name disambiguation pages